Maihueniopsis (from Greek opsis, "view", referring to its resemblance to the unrelated Maihuenia) is a genus of the cactus family (Cactaceae), containing 18 species.

The former genus Puna R.Kiesling is now synonym to Maihueniopsis.

Species
Species of the genus Maihueniopsis according to Plants of the World Online :

References

External links

Opuntioideae genera
Opuntioideae
Taxa named by Carlo Luigi Spegazzini